Cases Journal was an open access, peer-reviewed medical journal publishing any case reports from any area of healthcare that were understandable, ethical, authentic, and included all information essential to its interpretation. The journal had no publication criteria based on the interest level of the case. The editor in chief of Cases Journal was Richard Smith. Articles that were published in Cases Journal are indexed in PubMed and archived in PubMed Central.

References

General medical journals
BioMed Central academic journals
Publications established in 2008
English-language journals
Publications disestablished in 2010
Creative Commons Attribution-licensed journals
Case report journals